West Toronto was a federal electoral district represented in the House of Commons of Canada from 1867 to 1904. It was located in the city of Toronto, in the province of Ontario. The district was created by the British North America Act of 1867 and was renamed Toronto West in 1903.

West Toronto was initially defined as consisting of St. John, St. Andrew, St. Patrick, and St. George's Wards of Toronto. In 1872, St. John's Ward was excluded from the riding. In 1892, the riding was given an additional seat in the House of Commons of Canada so that its voters elected two Members of Parliament.

Electoral history

(Elected members indicated in bold text.)

See also 

 List of Canadian federal electoral districts
 Past Canadian electoral districts

External links 
 Website of the Parliament of Canada

Former federal electoral districts of Ontario
Federal electoral districts of Toronto